Ba Fadal (Somali: Baa Fadal, Arabic: با فضل) are a Benadiri clan predominantly based in historic Shingani district of Mogadishu. However, there are established settlements on the road to Merca in the village of 'Number 50' (Somali: Lambar Konton)

Clan Tree 
The Ba Fadal according Anita Adam's Phd are made of 4 sub clans:

 Abud
 Aw Ali
 Aw Mir 
 Reer Aw Ikar

Notable People 

 Shaykh Ahmed Muhiyyidin, was the teacher of Shaykh Sufi from who he received his ijaza on the qaddiriyah tariqa from.
 Mohamed Abdirahman Abdirahim Abud Bafadal (Haji Wandow).He founded and established "Number 50" (lambar konton) which is a village between Mogadishu and Merca.
 Ali Mohamed (Ali Wandow) was the son of Haji Wandow and he was the first person to establish (Number 50) (Lambar konton).
Ali Wandow had 5 sons (Five sons),and they are
1:- Mohamed Ali Wandow Bafadal
2:- Ahmed Ali Wandow Bafadal
3:- AbdiHakim Ali Wandow Bafadal
4:- Abdirisak Ali Wandow Bafadal
5:- Yasin Ali Wandow Bafadal.

A1:- Mohamed Ali Wandow Bafadal had three(3) daughters. 1: Fatma 2: Zeynab 3: Ashwaq

A2:- Ahmed Ali Wandow Bafadal had a daughter and a son, 1: Fatma (daughter) 2: Mohamed (son)

A3:- AbdiHakim Ali Wandow Bafadal had four (4) Daughter and a Son. 
1: Fatma, 2: Khadra, 3:Najma, 4: Nasteha (daughters) and the son is 5: Mohamed

A4:- Abdirisak Ali Wandow Bafadal has 5 sons and 4 daughters and continue
1: Ilham Bafadal, 2:Huda Bafadal, 3: Zeyna Bafadal, 4: Leyla Bafadal. (the daughters) 
1: Zayed Bafadal, 2: Saleh Bafadal, 3: Mohamed Bafadal, 4:Yasin Bafadal 5: Haitham Bafadal.

A5:- Yasin Ali Wandow Bafadal has three (3) sons and five (5) daughters.
1:Sadam Bafadal, 2: Faisal Bafadal, 3: Sadaq Bafadal. (sons) 
1: Maida Bafadal, 2:Shamsa Bafadal, 3:Farhiya, 4:Asma Bafadal, 5:Zeynab Bafadal.

B1: is the 4th generation of Haji Wandow
a. Zayid Abdirisak Ali Wandow Bafadal ( Zayed Bafadal) Has a son, 1: Mohamed Zayid Abdirisak Ali Wandow Bafadal (Hamoudi)

References

Mogadishu
Clans